A double summit, double peak, twin summit, or twin peak refers to a mountain or hill that has two summits, separated by a col or saddle.

One well-known double summit is Austria’s highest mountain, the Großglockner, where the main summit of the Großglockner is separated from that of the Kleinglockner by the Glocknerscharte col in the area of a geological fault. Other double summits have resulted from geological folding. For example, on Mont Withrow in British Columbia, resistant sandstones form the limbs of the double summit, whilst the softer rock in the core of the fold was eroded.

Triple peaks occur more rarely; one example is the Rosengartenspitze in the Dolomites. The Illimani in Bolivia is an example of a rare quadruple summit.

Well known double summits (selection) 
Well known double summits are (roughly from east to west):

Europe

Limestone Alps 

 Schneeberg (Lower Austria)
 Kaiserstein in the massif of the Wetterin, Styria
 Lugauer in the Gesäuse, Styria
 Krippenstein (north of the Dachstein Group)
Bischofsmütze in the Dachstein region (Gosaukamm)
 Brietkogel and the Eiskogel in the Tennen Mountains, Salzburg state
 Karlspitzen in the Kaiser Mountains
 Roßstein and Buchstein, Upper Bavaria
 Klammspitze in the Ammergau Alps
 Guffert in the Rofan, Tyrol
 Grauspitz, Liechtenstein
 Furchetta in the Geisler Group (?)
 Altmann in the Alpstein, East Switzerland

Central Alps 

 Großglockner
 Seekarspitze (Schladming Tauern)
 Gleichenberge (Styria)
 Lasörling in the Großvenediger, High Tauern
 Unterberghorn in eastern North Tyrol
 Wilde Kreuzspitze in the Zillertal Alps
 Rofelewand in the Ötztal Alps
 Watzespitze in the Kaunergrat, Ötztal Alps
 Wildspitze in the Weißkamm, Ötztal Alps
 Schwarzhorn and Weißhorn in South Tyrol
 Ortstock, Glarus Alps
 Aiguille du Dru in the Mont Blanc massif
 Aiguille Verte in the Mont Blanc region

Other mountain ranges of Europe 

 Smolikas (Bogdani and Kapetan Tsekouras) in Greece
 Bubenik in Upper Lusatia
 Strohmberg in Upper Lusatia
 Špičák (Sattelberg) in the Ore Mountains
 Burgstadtl in the Duppau Mountains
 Schanzberge near Tischberg, South Bohemia
 Schwarze Mauer and Kamenec on the Upper Austrian-Bohemian border
 Großer Auerberg in the Harz
 Ehrenbürg, a Zeugenberg in Franconian Switzerland
 Hohenstoffeln (volcano in the Hegau)
 Berguedà in the Pyrenees
 Pen y Fan in the Brecon Beacons

Asia 

 Hasan Dağı in the region of Cappadocia, Turkey
 Ushba in Georgia
 Elbrus (twin-peaked volcano) in the Caucasus
 Raja Gyepang in Central Lahaul, India
 Machapucharé in the Annapurna massif in the Himalayas, Nepal
 Chogolisa in the Karakorum, Pakistan
 Broad Peak with pre- and main summit in the Karakorum, China/Pakistan
 Gasherbrum IV, southern neighbour of Broad Peak in the Karakorum, Pakistan

Other mountain regions 

 Mont Ross on the Kerguelen Islands
 Pico Duarte on Haiti (Dominican Republic)
 Chaupi Orco in the Andes
 Ancohuma in the Andes
 The Brothers in the Olympic Mountains (USA/Washington)
 Double Peak in the Cascade Mountains (USA/Washington)
 Kaufmann Peaks in Banff National Park Canada

References 

Summits
Geodesy
Cartography
Physical geography
Slope landforms
Topography
Oronyms